Gongdeok Station is a subway station on Seoul Subway Line 5, Line 6, AREX and the Gyeongui–Jungang Line.

Gongdeok Market, near Exit 4 of the station, is on the Seoul list of Asia's 10 greatest street food cities for the haemul pajeon.

Gallery

References

Railway stations opened in 1996
Metro stations in Mapo District
Seoul Subway Line 5
Seoul Subway Line 6
AREX
Yongsan Line
Gyeongui–Jungang Line